DeMarcus Van Dyke (born January 17, 1989) is a former American football cornerback who played six seasons in the National Football League (NFL). Van Dyke is currently the cornerbacks coach for the Miami Hurricanes football team. He was drafted by the Oakland Raiders in the 3rd round, 81st overall of the 2011 NFL Draft. He played college football for the University of Miami Hurricanes. He has also been a member of the Pittsburgh Steelers and the Kansas City Chiefs.

Early years
Van Dyke attended Monsignor Edward Pace High School in Miami Gardens, Florida, where he was a two-sport star in both football and track. He played high school football on both sides of the ball for coach Joe Zaccheo. As a defensive back in his junior season, Van Dyke had 12 passes broken up, four interceptions and returned two kickoffs and four punts for touchdowns. He also played as a wide receiver very little his junior year, but still managed to recorded eight receptions for 197 yards. In his senior season in 2006, he recorded 56 tackles and seven interceptions (one returned for a touchdown), while also playing wide receiver on offense a lot more and caught 21 passes for 417 yards. He only had 12 total kick returns since teams often chose to kick away from him.

Also a standout track & field athlete at Monsignor, Van Dyke was one of the state's top sprinters. He posted a career-best time of 21.31 seconds in the 200-meter dash at the 2007 FHSAA 2A Region 4, while also anchoring the 4x100 meter relay team to victory with a time of 41.47 seconds. At the 2007 FHSAA 1A Outdoor State Finals, he anchored the 4x100 relay team that claimed the state title with a school-record time of 40.78 seconds. He also placed second in the 200-meter race (21.46 s) behind Deonte Thompson.

Recruiting
Van Dyke was ranked as the No. 16 athlete and the No. 21 player in the state of Florida by Rivals.com. He was rated the No. 15 cornerback and the No. 7 player in the state by Scout.com. He was ranked as the No. 15 player in state by The Orlando Sentinel and the No. 25 player by St. Petersburg Times. He was a member of The Atlanta Journal-Constitution Super Southern 100.  He was also rated as the No. 11 player in the state and the No. 12 defensive back in the nation by SuperPrep.

College career
Van Dyke was a dual-sport athlete at the University of Miami (football and track). During his collegiate career at Miami, Van Dyke played in 51 games with 21 starts, totalling 80 tackles (including three for loss), 10 passes defended and three interceptions.

Freshman
As a freshman in 2007, Van Dyke started eight of 12 games at either left or right cornerback and tallied 14 tackles. He started at right cornerback in his first collegiate game and saw action on 41 plays, making three tackles (two solo) against Marshall. He started at left cornerback and made two solo tackles at Oklahoma.  He started at left cornerback and made one solo tackle against Texas A&M. He made three tackles (two solo) in a win at FSU. He started at right cornerback and made two solo tackles. He started at right cornerback against NC State and made two solo tackles. At Virginia Tech, he started at left cornerback and made one solo tackle. At Boston College, he started at left cornerback and made one solo tackle.

Sophomore
As a sophomore in 2008, Van Dyke changed his jersey number from 30 to 8. He played in all 13 games and made two starts (at NC State and vs. Cal) at right cornerback. He recorded 16 tackles (11 solo, five assisted) and had a pass breakup. He made three tackles at Duke. He also had a pair tackles against Virginia Tech and at NC State. He tallied a career-high five tackles, all solo, against Cal in the Emerald Bowl.

In track & field, Van Dyke ran a season-best time in the 100 metres in the prelims of the ACC Championships with a time of 10.70 seconds. His season-best time in the 200 metres also came in the ACC Championships with a prelim time of 21.54 seconds. He was a member of the 4x100 meter relay team that ran a season-best time of 40.67 seconds for a second-place finish at the Georgia Tech Invitational. Also a member of the 4x100 relay that placed sixth at the ACC Championships with a time of 40.75 seconds. Indoors, his personal-best time of 6.81 seconds in the 60 metres came at the ACC Championships in the prelims, but placed eighth in the finals with a time of 6.91 seconds.

Junior
As a junior in 2009, Van Dyke played in 12 games and started eight at the cornerback position. He recorded his first career interception with the 'Canes trailing in the fourth quarter at Wake Forest. He tallied four tackles in back-to-back weeks versus Clemson and at Wake Forest. He set a career-high in total tackles (6) and solo stops (5) against Wisconsin in the Champs Sports Bowl. He also had three pass break-ups on the year. He recorded a tackle for a loss in back-to-back games at UCF and versus Clemson.

In track & field, Van Dyke ran a 6.47 in his only attempt in the 55-meter hurdles at the Tom Jones Invitational.

Senior
As a senior in 2010, Van Dyke played in 13 games, starting three. He spent time at left cornerback and in the nickel package. He had a season-high four solo stops at Clemson. He had two tackles at Ohio State. He tallied a single solo tackle against FAMU, FSU, North Carolina and at Georgia Tech. He posted 10 assisted stops on the season, including three at Duke. He had one tackle for a loss of two yards against North Carolina. He forced and recovered a fumble at Clemson. He picked off two passes on the season, including one at Pittsburgh that he returned for 74 yards. He also recorded five pass break-ups.

In track & field, Van Dyke's season-best effort in the 100-meter dash came in the prelims of the ACC Championships with a career-best time of 10.61 seconds. He ran the second leg of the 4x100 meter relay team that advanced to the NCAA semifinals, ran a season-best time of 39.57 seconds at the NCAA quarterfinals (setting a school record) and placed fifth at the Penn Relays with a time of 40.35 seconds. Indoors, his season-best effort in the 60-meter dash came in the prelims of the National Open at 6.84 seconds, in the final he finished fourth in 6.87 seconds. He ran the anchor leg of the 4x400 meter relay team that finished with a time of 3:15.49 at the Tyson Invitational.

Professional career
Van Dyke ran a 4.28-second 40-yard dash at the 2011 NFL Scouting Combine, which tied for the fourth-fastest time (which has since become the fifth-fastest) at the combine since electronic timing began in 1999.

Oakland Raiders
Van Dyke was selected by the Oakland Raiders in the 3rd round 81st overall of the 2011 NFL draft. As a rookie, he was used sparingly, contributing 15 tackles and one interception.

Pittsburgh Steelers
Van Dyke was signed by the Pittsburgh Steelers on September 7, 2012.

Kansas City Chiefs
On January 12, 2014, the Kansas City Chiefs signed Van Dyke.

Minnesota Vikings
On January 8, 2015, the Minnesota Vikings signed Van Dyke.

Atlanta Falcons
On March 15, 2016, the Atlanta Falcons signed Van Dyke. On September 3, 2016, he was placed on injured reserve with a concussion. On September 10, he was released from injured reserve.

Coaching career
DeMarcus is currently a cornerbacks coach for the Miami Hurricanes, a role he was hired for in 2021. Previously he was the assistant director of recruiting for the Miami Hurricanes, for the 2019 and 2020 seasons and in 2018 he was a defensive quality control analyst also for the Miami Hurricanes. In 2017 he was the cornerbacks coach as ASA College in Miami.

Personal life
Van Dyke's cousin, David is a cornerback that played collegiately for Tennessee State. They were teammates on the Kansas City Chiefs during the 2014 offseason.

DeMarcus is a Miami Gardens, FL native and is married to Kiawana Van Dyke, they live in Miramar, FL. The couple has a son, DeMarcus Jr. and a daughter, Kia.

References

External links
 
  
 

1989 births
Living people
Monsignor Edward Pace High School alumni
American football cornerbacks
Miami Hurricanes football players
Oakland Raiders players
Pittsburgh Steelers players
Kansas City Chiefs players
Players of American football from Miami